Ornipholidotos ackeryi is a butterfly in the family Lycaenidae. It is found in Cameroon. The habitat consists of forests.

References

Butterflies described in 2000
Taxa named by Michel Libert
Ornipholidotos
Endemic fauna of Cameroon
Butterflies of Africa